Rallé, also known as Master of the Town of Consuls (MTC), is an American artist whose work has most recently been shown in the Meisel Gallery and the Bruce R. Lewin Fine Art in New York City. His paintings have accompanied several articles in the magazine Omni, and appeared as covers of several books. Rallé's work has also been featured in Time Life Books, Esquire, Penthouse, Gulf-Commentator, Toronto Life, Graphics Annual and American Illustration 3. He published an autobiography in 2003, which won the 2004 Sappi European Printer of the Year gold award.

Awards and tributes 
First Prize for Oil – Majska Izlozba, Moša Pijade, Bitola, Macedonia (1977)
Merit Award – The Toronto Art Directors Club (1983)
First Prize for Oil – Barron Arts Center (1985), Woodbridge, N.J., USA
First Place – Artist' Liaison: National Juried Art Competition (1987), Santa Monica, CA, USA
Award of Excellence for the painting Guilt – Communication Arts, Illustration Annual (1990)
Art Criticism by Jorge Alberto Manrique (2007)

Publications 
Rallé- Master of the Town of Consuls (2003). The book was published by Antilope Art Books in Lier, Belgium. Commentaries were provided by Marcel van Jole – founder of the Museum of Contemporary Art of Antwerp (MuHKA), Yonah Foncé – curator at the Museum of Contemporary Art of Antwerp (MuHKA), and Michel Gaudet – both an artist and an art critic.
The Mind's Eye – The art of OMNI (2014). The book is published by Powerhouse books. Authors: Jeremy Frommer, Rick Schwartz, and Ben Bova.
Our Human Herds: The Philosophy of Dual Morality and a Theory of Moral Evolution By Martin Fritz (2015)
Foundation

Exhibitions 
1986- Delaware Art Museum, Invitational Exhibition, National Academy of Fantastic Art

Museum Collections 
2019- Art Gallery of Alberta. Temptress, 1962, Oil on panel, 20.5 x 15.4 cm, Gift of Buddy Victor & Al Osten.

Gallery

References 

Living people
American contemporary painters
Macedonian painters
Romanian painters
1949 births
20th-century American painters
American male painters
21st-century American painters
Romanian surrealist artists
American surrealist artists
20th-century American male artists